Lübeck is an electoral constituency (German: Wahlkreis) represented in the Bundestag. It elects one member via first-past-the-post voting. Under the current constituency numbering system, it is designated as constituency 11. It is located in southern Schleswig-Holstein, comprising the city of Lübeck and parts of the Herzogtum Lauenburg district.

Lübeck was created for the inaugural 1949 federal election. Since 2021, it has been represented by Tim Klüssendorf of the Social Democratic Party (SPD).

Geography
Lübeck is located in southern Schleswig-Holstein. As of the 2021 federal election, it comprises the urban district of Lübeck and the Ämter of Berkenthin and former Amt of Sandesneben from the Herzogtum Lauenburg district.

History
Lübeck was created in 1949. Until 1972, it was constituency 9 in the numbering system. In the 1949 and 1953 elections, it covered the entirety of the city of Lübeck with the exception of voting districts 28, 30–33, 35–42, 52–55, 57–59, 140–143, and 151–161). In the 1957 and 1961 elections, it did not cover voting districts 26, 28–33, 35–43, 45–49, 52–57, 145–148, 150–153, 155, 156, 158, and 160. In the 1965 election, it acquired constituency number 11, and its borders were coterminous with the urban district of Lübeck, which remained until the 2002 election. At this election, the Ämter of Berkenthin and Sandesneben were transferred into the Lübeck constituency; the Amt of Sandesneben was abolished in 2008, but the constituency was not geographically affected.

Members
The constituency has been held by the Social Democratic Party (SPD) during all but five Bundestag terms since 1949; it returned a representative from the SPD in every federal election from 1969 through 2013. Its first representative was Paul Bromme of the SPD, who served for a single term. The constituency was won by the Christian Democratic Union (CDU) in 1953, and represented by Paul Bock (until 1957) and Helmut Wendelborn. It was won by the SPD in 1969, and represented by future Minister-President of Schleswig-Holstein Björn Engholm until 1983. He was succeeded by Reinhold Hiller, who served until 2002. Between then and 2017, it was represented by Gabriele Hiller-Ohm. It was held by Claudia Schmidtke of the CDU for one term before SPD candidate Tim Klüssendorf regained it in 2021.

Election results

2021 election

2017 election

2013 election

2009 election

References

Federal electoral districts in Schleswig-Holstein
1949 establishments in West Germany
Constituencies established in 1949